"Spelling on the Stone" is a 1988 song about American musician Elvis Presley, recorded by an uncredited artist impersonating him. The song was released in response to a number of Elvis sightings after the singer's death. Upon the song's release, many radio listeners began to report sightings of the singer, while others questioned whether or not the song was actually recorded by Presley. In the years since, the recording has been attributed by some sources to Dan Willis, while others claim the authorship still to be unknown.

History
Following the death of Elvis Presley in 1977, a popular rumor within the music industry was that Presley had faked his death. In the years following, a number of Elvis sightings had occurred. Record label LS Records released the song "Spelling on the Stone" in late 1988 to capitalize on the popularity of the sightings. According to LS Records owner Lee Stoller, who produced the song, his daughter Tammy received the recording of the song in August 1988 from an anonymous man who arrived at the label's offices in a limousine. With distribution rights from Curb Records, LS Records released the song to radio by the end of 1988. The single release did not credit an artist. The title of the song refers to the fact that Presley's middle name Aron is misspelled "Aaron" on his tombstone, which at the time was a common argument against the singer's death. The song features an uncredited vocalist with a delivery similar to Presley's; it takes a first-person narrative purported to be from the singer's perspective, to suggest he had faked his death.

According to an article in The Jersey Journal, when the song was played on WYNY (now WKTU), then a country music radio station in New York City, listeners immediately called the station to report sightings of the singer. At the time, the station's program director did not think the recording was actually by Presley. He thought the recording could have been done by Terry Stafford or Ronnie McDowell. The song was also popular at the radio station WNOE-FM in New Orleans, Louisiana. According to that station's program director, the single was delivered to the station by an anonymous figure in a pink Cadillac, and he received 47 calls from listeners after playing it for the first time. He also did not think the recording was actually Presley's vocals, but chose to play it because of the reception from listeners. Despite this, not all reception to the song was positive. An article published by The Canadian Press stated that radio station WCVG in Cincinnati, Ohio, then airing an "all-Elvis" format, refused to play the song as its program directors thought it was "definitely a hoax". Presley's ex-wife, Priscilla Presley, denied that the recording was of her husband as she thought he would not be "cruel enough to stage his death". Likewise, a media coordinator for Graceland, Presley's estate, called the song a "very cruel hoax". John Davis, then a professor of music theory at Stevens Institute of Technology in Hoboken, New Jersey, also did not think the recording was of Presley. He thought the vocal delivery had "too much vibrato" and "approaches a caricature of Elvis."

Impact and authorship
The airplay received by the single caused it to enter the Billboard Hot Country Songs charts, where it charted for four weeks between December 1988 and January 1989 with a peak of number 82. Following the release of the single, LS Records issued a full album also titled Spelling on the Stone, featuring various songs themed around Presley and again not crediting the artist.

In the book Elvis Music FAQ, author Mike Eder considered the track "an interesting artifact of the 'Elvis is alive' mania that existed in the late eighties." He also stated that the vocalist on the track had been identified as Dan Willis, a musician who had recorded on LS Records. In comparison, chart historian Joel Whitburn stated that the vocals were "reportedly" those of Willis. Similarly, Ron Sylvester of The Springfield News-Leader, after hearing Willis sing at a Branson, Missouri theater owned by Cristy Lane in 1992, stated that "if you hear Willis sing, you might draw a conclusion as to the identity of the mysterious Elvis-sounding voice on that record."

References

1988 singles
Curb Records singles
Songs about Elvis Presley
Works of unknown authorship